Prelude to Christopher is a 1934 novel by Eleanor Dark (1901–1985). It was awarded the ALS Gold Medal in 1934.

Plot summary
The storyline is nonlinear and of interest to those interested in the establishment of modernism in the arts in Australia.  The story centers on a Eugenicist experiment gone awry on a remote island.  The repercussions of the incident play out in a young woman's decision whether to have a child. A recurring symbol in the book is a painting of the island with the doomed eugenicist's experiment.

Reviews
A reviewer in The Sydney Morning Herald noted that "It stands apart from the ordinary run of Australian fiction because of the author's mastery over her material, and her capacity for making every phrase tell...Not many Australian writers have exhibited such technical efficiency in a first novel."

After the book's re-issue by Halstead Press in 2011, Anne Maxwell, of the University of Melbourne, found that "Arguably, part of the emotive power of Prelude to Christopher stems from the fact that it contains autobiographical elements; indeed, some critics maintain that it was based on a dark family secret." Maxwell notes that Dark's mother committed suicide and that her father was a sexual predator and tyrant. She continued: "Underlining the extent of Dark’s investment in the finer emotions, especially the human capacity for compassion and empathy and the ability to hit back at the ideal of rational efficiency, is the novel’s non-realist style."

External links
 Varuna: The Writers House

References

Eugenics in fiction
Novels by Eleanor Dark
1934 Australian novels
ALS Gold Medal winning works
Nonlinear narrative novels